The second season of Tawag ng Tanghalan was an amateur singing competition currently aired as a segment of the noontime show It's Showtime from June 12, 2017 to June 2, 2018. All juries from the previous season reprise their jury duties, except for Bobot Mortiz. Gary Valenciano was added as a new judge for the second season.



Hosts and judges
Rey Valera returned as the head coach for the second season, with Louie Ocampo, Jaya, Ogie Alcasid, Yeng Constantino serving as fill-in for Valera. Judges Billy Crawford, Karylle, Karla Estrada, K Brosas, Nyoy Volante, Mitoy Yonting, Rico J. Puno, Erik Santos, Kyla, Jed Madela, and Jolina Magdangal returned as judges for the second season. Gary Valenciano was added as a new judge, serving as fill-in for Valera.

Sitti Navarro served as a guest judge at daily rounds of the second quarter.

Vhong Navarro, Anne Curtis, Amy Perez-Castillo, and Vice Ganda served as hosts for the second season, with Ryan Bang, Jhong Hilario, Teddy Corpuz, and Jugs Jugueta serving as co-hosts as well as the Gong. James Reid and Nadine Lustre also served as co-hosts.

Kim Chiu, Maja Salvador, Pia Wurtzbach, Iza Calzado, Robi Domingo, Luis Manzano and Bela Padilla served as guest hosts in the absence of the main hosts.

Prizes 
The winner as the second Grand Champion of Tawag ng Tanghalan will receive ultimate vacation package from 2GO Travel, music gadgets package from JB Music, negosyo package from Siomai House, premium television sets from HKTV, talent management contract, a brand new house and lot from Camella, and a trophy, plus a tax-free cash of ₱2,000,000 from Nescafé Creamy White. The 2nd placer will receive a tax-free cash of ₱500,000 from Nescafé Creamy White, while the 3rd placer and tax-free cash of ₱250,000 from Nescafé Creamy White. Those who are able to advance to the Top 6 but were not able to advance to the Top 3 were given a consolation prize of ₱100,000 cash.

Quarter I

Daily Rounds 

Color Key:

 Italicized names denotes a contender is a resbaker

 due of Semi-Finals, Jeremiah Tiangco will proceed to Quarter 2

Semi-finals
The first quarter of the contest covered the months from June to August. The week-long showdown took place on August 7–12, 2017.

Day 1 (August 7)
 Theme: Audition Song

Day 2 (August 8)
 Theme: Awit sa Pamilya (Song for the Family)

Day 3 (August 9)
 Theme: Musical influence

Day 4 (August 10)
 Theme: Hurado's song choice (Judges' song choice)

Day 5 (August 11)
 Theme: Fight song

Day 6 (August 12)
 Theme: Semi-final song

Results

Jovany Satera and Alfred Relatado (Mindanao) were declared as the first two grand finalists. Eliminated semi-finalist Aila Santos returned for the Ultimate Resbak.

Quarter II

Daily Rounds 

Color Key:

 Italicized names denotes a contender is a resbaker

 due of Semi-Finals, Charles Kevin Tan will proceed to Quarter 3

Semi-finals

The second quarter of the contest covered the months from August to October. The week-long showdown took place on October 21–27, 2017.

Day 1 (October 21)

 Theme: Audition Song

Day 2 (October 23)
 Theme: Fight song

Day 3 (October 24)
 Theme: Musical influence

Day 4 (October 25)
 Theme: Awit sa Pamilya (Song for the Family)

Day 5 (October 26)
 Theme: Hurado's song choice (Judges' song choice)

Day 6 (October 27)
 Theme: Semi-final song

Results

Anton Antenorcruz (Metro Manila) and Remy Luntayao (Visayas) were announced as the 3rd and 4th grand finalists. Eliminated semi-finalists Rico Garcia, John Raymundo and Mark Michael Garcia returned for the Ultimate Resbak

Global Semi-finals
The Global semi-finals are consisted of Filipino contenders from all over the world selected during audition on their respective region. The week-long showdown took place on December 11 to 16, 2017 held at ABS-CBN Studio 3.

Makoto Inoue (Japan) and Steven Paysu (California, United States) were announced as the 5th and 6th grand finalists. Eliminated global semi-finalists Penny Salcedo and Jing Wenghofer returned for the Ultimate Resbak

Quarter III

Daily Rounds

Color key:

 Italicized names denotes a contender is a resbaker

Due to the semifinals, Janine Berdin will proceed to Quarter 4.

Semi-finals
The third quarter of the contest covered the months from October 2017 to January 2018. The week-long showdown took place on January 29 – February 3, 2018.

Color Key:

Tuko Delos Reyes (Luzon) and Sofronio Vasquez III (Mindanao) were announced as the 7th and 8th grand finalists. Eliminated semi-finalists Boyet Onte, Lalainne Clarisse Araña and Ato Arman returned for the Ultimate Resbak

Notes

Quarter IV

Daily Rounds 

Color Key:

 Italicized names denotes a contender is a resbaker

 due of Semi-Finals, John Mark Digamon will proceed to Season 3

Semi-finals
The fourth quarter of the contest covered the months from February to May. The week-long showdown took place on May 12–18, 2018.

Day 1 (12 May)
 Theme: Awiting Pangmalakasan 
 Judges: Rey Valera (head judge), Ogie Alcasid, Yeng Constantino, Kyla, and Karylle

Day 2 (14 May)
 Theme: Awit kay Inay (Song for Mother)
 Judges: Rey Valera (head judge), Louie Ocampo, Yeng Constantino, Karylle and K Brosas
Following Anne Curtis and Vice Ganda's absence, co-host Jhong Hilario joined the main hosts along with guest host Maja Salvador.

Day 3 (15 May)
 Theme: Awit ni Idol (Song of Idol)
 Judges: Rey Valera (head judge), Jed Madela, Erik Santos, Kyla and Jaya
Following Anne Curtis and Vice Ganda's absence, co-host Jhong Hilario joined the main hosts.

Day 4 (16 May)
 Hashtag: #TNT2Q4HuradosChoice
 Theme: Hurados (Judges') song choice
 Judges: Rey Valera (head judge), Yeng Constantino, Erik Santos, Kyla and K Brosas
 Hosts: Jhong Hilario, Maja Salvador, Amy Perez-Castillo. Vhong Navarro
 Gong: Ryan Bang
Following Anne Curtis and Vice Ganda's absence, co-host Jhong Hilario joined the main hosts along with guest host Maja Salvador.

Day 5 (17 May)
 Theme: OPM Hits
 Judges: Rey Valera (head judge), Ogie Alcasid, Nyoy Volante, Karylle and Kyla
Following Vice Ganda's absence, co-host Jhong Hilario joined the main host.

Day 6 (18 May)
 Theme: Semifinal song
 Judges: Rey Valera (head judge), Jaya, Mitoy Yonting, Karylle and K Brosas
 Group performance: "Bulong ng Damdamin"
Following Vice Ganda and Vhong Navarro's absence, co-hosts Jhong Hilario and Jugs Jugueta joined the main hosts.

Results

Janine Berdin and Reggie Tortugo (Visayas) were announced as the 9th and 10th grand finalists. Eliminated semi-finalists Mark Douglas Dagal, Aljun Alborme, Arabelle Dela Cruz, Adelene Rabulan, Arbie Baula, JM Bales, and Christian Niel Bahaya returned for the Ultimate Resbak.

Ultimate Resbak
All Semi-finalists who lost were now Ultimate Resbakers. They competed again and had another chance to qualify for the Grand Finals. The week-long showdown took place on May 19–26, 2018. John Mark Saga of Quarter 1 and Charles Kevin Tan of Quarter 3 chose not to compete for the wildcard due to prior commitments.

Day 1 (19 May)
 Guest host: Bela Padilla
 Judges: Rey Valera (head judge), Mitoy Yonting, Karylle, Jaya, and K Brosas
 Group performance: "Set Fire to the Rain"
 Musical guests: Mitoy Yonting and Klarisse De Guzman ("Don't Stop Me Now")
Following Vice Ganda's absence, co-host Jhong Hilario joined the main hosts along with guest host Bela Padilla.

Day 2 (21 May)
Judges: Rey Valera (head judge), Yeng Constantino, Erik Santos, Karylle and K Brosas
Musical guests: Randy Santiago and Eumee Capile

Day 3 (22 May)
Judges: Rey Valera (head judge), Yeng Constantino, Erik Santos, Jaya and Kyla
Musical guests: Jaya and Jona Viray ("Can't Take My Eyes Off You")

Day 4 (23 May)
Judges: Rey Valera (head judge), Nyoy Volante, Karylle, Kyla and K Brosas
Musical guests: Jaime Rivera and Marielle Montellano

Day 5 (24 May)
Judges: Rey Valera (head judge), Ogie Alcasid, Yeng Constantino, Karylle and K Brosas
Musical guests: BoybandPH and Yeng Constantino

Day 6 (25 May)
Judges: Rey Valera (head judge), Ogie Alcasid, Jed Madela, Yeng Constantino and Erik Santos
Musical guests: South Border and Froilan Canlas
Following Amy Perez' absence, co-host Jhong Hilario joined the main host.

Day 7 (26 May)
 Judges: Rey Valera (head judge), Ogie Alcasid, Jed Madela, K Brosas, and Yeng Constantino
 Musical guests: Ogie Alcasid and Janno Gibbs ("Pinakamagandang Lalaki"/"Mahirap Maging Pogi")

Arabelle Dela Cruz (Luzon) and Ato Arman (Mindanao) were announced as the 11th and 12th grand finalists.

Elimination tableColor key:Ang Huling Tapatan (Grand Finals)
The week-long showdown for the Grand Finals took place on May 28 – June 2, 2018 held at Aliw Theater.

 Summary of Grand Finalists Color Key:Results Details * Global contender. They received prizes however in their local currency.

 Round 1 (May 28-29, 2018) 

 Judges: Rey Valera (head judge), Rico J. Puno, Yeng Constantino, Erik Santos, and Karylle
 Gong: 
 Monday: Teddy Corpuz
 Tuesday: Ryan Bang
 Musical guests:
 Monday: Dulce ("Paano")
 Tuesday: Gloc 9 & Moira Dela Torre ("Sirena")
Following Vhong Navarro's absence, co-host Jhong Hilario joined the main hosts for Round 1.
For every grand finalist, a featurette was aired prior to each performance.

Round 2 (May 30, 2018)
 Theme: Fight Song
 Judges: Rey Valera (head judge), K Brosas, Jed Madela, Nyoy Volante, and Kyla
 Gong: Teddy Corpuz
 Musical Guest: Imelda Papin ("Bakit") ("Kung Liligaya Ka Sa Piling Ng Iba")  ("Isang Linggong Pag-Ibig")

Following Vhong Navarro's absence, co-host Jhong Hilario joined the main hosts

Round 3 (May 31, 2018)
 Theme: Joyful Song for Loved Ones
 Judges: Rey Valera (head judge), K Brosas, Jed Madela, Nyoy Volante, and Kyla
 Gong: 
 Ryan Bang
 Musical Guests:
 Jay R & Pilita Corrales ("Kapantay ay Langit")
Following Vhong Navarro's absence, co-host Jhong Hilario joined the main hosts

Round 4 (June 1, 2018)
 Theme: Now or Never
 Judges: Rey Valera (head judge), Ogie Alcasid, Rico J. Puno, Mitoy Yonting, and Jaya
 Gong: 
 Teddy Corpuz
 Hosts: Vice Ganda, Anne Curtis, Amy Perez & Vhong Navarro
 Musical Guest:
Rey Valera ("Sorry Na, Pwede Ba?"/"Malayo Pa Ang Umaga")

Live Finale (June 2, 2018)
Top 6

Final 3

Janine Berdin from Visayas emerged as the Grand Champion, followed by Ato Arman as the second placer and Steven Paysu as the third placer.

 Elimination table Color Key:Results Details'

 * Global contender. They received prizes however in their local currency.
 ** Lalainne Clarisse Araña entered the semifinals twice. On the first quarter, she was gonged, hence she returned for the third quarter.

References 
Scores

Sources

External links
 Tawag ng Tanghalan

Tawag ng Tanghalan seasons
2017 Philippine television seasons
2018 Philippine television seasons